Nick Simmons (born 24 July 1981) is a former speedway rider from England.

Speedway career
He rode in the top tier of British Speedway riding for the Belle Vue Aces during the 2008 Elite League speedway season. He began his British career riding for Isle of Wight Islanders in 1998 and later became their club captain.

References 

1981 births
Living people
British speedway riders
Belle Vue Aces riders
Exeter Falcons riders
Isle of Wight Islanders riders
Newport Wasps riders